{{Infobox person
| name               = Han Joon-woo
| image              =
| birth_name         = Han Joon-woo
| birth_date         = 
| birth_place        = South Korea
| other_names        = Han Jun-wu, Han Jun-u, Han Jun-woo
| education          = University of Massachusetts
| occupation         = Actor, Model
| agent              = Woongbin ENS
| years_active       = 2013–present
| known_for          = My Unfamiliar Family  Be Melodramatic  Into the Ring
}}

Han Joon-woo is a South Korean actor and model. He is known for his roles in dramas Be Melodramatic, My Unfamiliar Family and Into the Ring''.

Biography and career
Han Joon-woo is a South Korean actor, he was born on March 28 in 1984. He made his debut as an actor in 2013. He appeared in the films Tazza: The Hidden Card and Gangnam Blues. In 2017 he appeared in movie 1987: When the Day Comes and he also appeared in drama series Hyena, My Unfamiliar Family and Into the Ring.

Filmography

Television series

Web series

Film

References

External links
 
 

1984 births
Living people
21st-century South Korean male actors
South Korean male models
South Korean male film actors
South Korean male television actors